FertiNitro (Fertilizantes Nitrogenados de Oriente) is Venezuela's largest fertilizer company, producing around 1.5m tons of urea per year. The nationalization meant a substantial windfall for holders of FertiNitro corporate bonds, with the government offering 105 cents on the dollar.

FertiNitro is one of the world's main producers of nitrogen fertilizer, with daily production capacity of 3,600 tonnes of ammonia and 4,400 tonnes of urea.

References

Fertilizer companies of Venezuela
Government-owned companies of Venezuela